Géza Kádas (1926–1979) was a Hungarian swimmer and Olympic medalist. He participated at the 1948 and 1952 Summer Olympics, winning a silver medal in 4 × 200 metre freestyle relay, and a bronze medal in 100 metre freestyle in 1948.

References

1926 births
1979 deaths
Hungarian male swimmers
Olympic swimmers of Hungary
Olympic silver medalists for Hungary
Olympic bronze medalists for Hungary
Swimmers at the 1948 Summer Olympics
Swimmers at the 1952 Summer Olympics
Olympic bronze medalists in swimming
Hungarian male freestyle swimmers
European Aquatics Championships medalists in swimming
Medalists at the 1948 Summer Olympics
Olympic silver medalists in swimming
20th-century Hungarian people